Eslamabad (also Romanized as Eslāmābād) is a village in Qanavat Rural District, in the Central District of Qom County, Qom Province, Iran. At the 2006 census, its population was 452, in 101 families.

References 

Populated places in Qom Province